Dasyvesica is a genus of snout moths erected by Maria Alma Solis in 1991.

Species
 Dasyvesica crinitalis
 Dasyvesica lophotalis
 Dasyvesica nepomuca

References

Epipaschiinae
Pyralidae genera